Guanyin is a town in Dazhu County, Sichuan province, China. , it has four residential neighborhoods and 18 villages under its administration:

Neighborhoods 
Guanyinqiao Community
Chaoyin Community
Baibazi Community
Xindian Community

Villages 
Youyi Village
Shuangxi Village
Daban Village
Qinggang Village
Qinghe Village
Gaohe Village
Mingyue Village
Jiajiaoshan Village
Xiaohe Village
Shuanghekou Village
Guanghui Village
Yan'er Village
Renyi Village
Gonghe Village
Wenchang Village
Puzhao Village
Jinxing Village
Sanqing Village

See also 
 List of township-level divisions of Sichuan

References 

Township-level divisions of Sichuan
Dazhu County